Radio Ključ is a Bosnian local public radio station, broadcasting from Ključ, Una-Sana Canton.

It was launched on 7 May 1970 by the municipal council of Ključ. This radio station broadcasts a variety of programs such as music, local news, talk shows, and sport. The program is mainly produced in Bosnian.

The estimated number of potential listeners of Radio Ključ is around 31,627.

Frequencies
The program is currently broadcast at 2 frequencies:

 Ključ, Una-Sana Canton 
 Ključ, Una-Sana Canton

References

External links 
 www.media-kljuc.ba
 Communications Regulatory Agency of Bosnia and Herzegovina

See also 
List of radio stations in Bosnia and Herzegovina

Ključ
Radio stations established in 1970